Björn Borg won the title, defeating Onny Parun 6–4, 6–4, 3–6, 6–2 in the final.

Draw

Finals

Section 1

Section 2

External links
 1974 South Australian Tennis Championships draw
 Draw (ITF)

Singles